State Route 309 (SR 309), also known as Union Grove Road, is a  east–west state highway in McMinn County, Tennessee. It serves as the primary access road from Interstate 75 (I-75, Exit 56) to the town of Niota.

Route description

SR 309 begins at an interchange with I-75 (Exit 56). It heads east past a few roadside businesses before passing through farmland as a two-lane highway. It then enters Niota and comes to an end at an intersection with U.S. Route 11 (US 11, Willson Street/SR 2) on the north side of town.

Major intersections

References

309
Transportation in McMinn County, Tennessee